The Beardmore 160 hp is a British six-cylinder, water-cooled aero engine that first ran in 1916, it was built by Arrol-Johnston and Crossley Motors for William Beardmore and Company as a development of the Beardmore 120 hp, itself a licensed-built version of the Austro-Daimler 6.

Development
The engine featured cast iron cylinders and mild steel concave pistons. Produced between March 1916 and December 1918, the design powered many World War I aircraft types. It was noted that the engine was not as reliable as its smaller capacity predecessor.

Applications
Airco DH.3
Armstrong Whitworth F.K.7
Austin Kestrel
Beardmore W.B.II
Beardmore W.B.X
Central Centaur IIA
Marinens Flyvebaatfabrikk M.F.6
Martinsyde G.102
Norman Thompson N.T.2B
Royal Aircraft Factory F.E.2
Royal Aircraft Factory R.E.7
Short Sporting Type
Supermarine Channel
Supermarine Sea King
Vickers F.B.14

Survivors
A Beardmore 160 hp has been restored to airworthy condition by The Vintage Aviator Ltd, an aircraft restoration company based in Wellington, New Zealand. The engine was found complete and in a preserved condition in a farm shed in    Uruguay, after a complete overhaul and ground test runs the engine powered the company's F.E.2b replica on its maiden flight.

Engines on display

A partially sectioned Beardmore 160 hp is on display at the Imperial War Museum Duxford.
The Beardmore 160 hp engine installed in the recently restored F.E.2 can be viewed at the Royal Air Force Museum London.

Specifications (160 hp)

See also

References

Notes

Bibliography

 Gunston, Bill. World Encyclopaedia of Aero Engines. Cambridge, England. Patrick Stephens Limited, 1989. 
 Jane's Fighting Aircraft of World War I. London. Studio Editions Ltd, 1993. 
 Lumsden, Alec. British Piston Engines and their Aircraft. Marlborough, Wiltshire: Airlife Publishing, 2003. .

External links

thevintageaviator.co.nz - Video of ground running a restored Beardmore 160 hp

1910s aircraft piston engines
160